Kerri Buchberger-Kendziora (born June 23, 1970, in Russell, Manitoba) is a retired volleyball player from Canada, who competed for her native country at the 1996 Summer Olympics in Atlanta, Georgia. There the resident of Winnipeg ended up in tenth place with the Women's National Team after having won the bronze medal a year earlier at the Pan American Games. Her brother is Kelly Buchberger, professional ice hockey coach and former player.

References

Canadian Olympic Committee

1970 births
Living people
Canadian women's volleyball players
Olympic volleyball players of Canada
Pan American Games bronze medalists for Canada
Volleyball players from Winnipeg
Volleyball players at the 1996 Summer Olympics
Pan American Games medalists in volleyball
Volleyball players at the 1995 Pan American Games
Medalists at the 1995 Pan American Games
20th-century Canadian women
21st-century Canadian women